1954 World Cup may refer to:

1954 Rugby League World Cup
1954 FIFA World Cup